8E or VIII-E may refer to :

 8E, the character mapping for the letter "É" in Mac OS Roman
 Bering Air (IATA code: 8E), an American airline headquartered in Nome, Alaska
 GCR Classes 8D and 8E, two pairs of three-cylinder compound steam locomotives
 Oflag VIII-E Johannisbrunn, a World War II German prisoner-of-war camp
 Stalag VIII-E, a German World War II prisoner-of-war camp
 Washington State Route 142 (previously Secondary State Highway 8E), a state highway in southern Washington
 Washington State Route 221 (previously Primary State Highway 8E), a 25.95-mile-long state highway

See also 
 E8 (disambiguation)